William J. Murphy (1916 – 4 September 1939) was the first British Royal Air Force (RAF) pilot to be shot down and killed during World War II.

Murphy was born in Mitchelstown, County Cork in Ireland to William Joseph Murphy and Katherine C. Murphy.

World War II 

Murphy was the officer pilot of flight N6188 OM, a Bristol Blenheim Bomber, part of 107 Squadron, which was taking part in the RAF's first bombing raid of the war against enemy ships in the German port of Wilhelmshaven on 4 September 1939, the day after war was declared on Germany. A navigator on another plane that day was Larry Slattery from Thurles in County Tipperary, who survived along with another officer, Sergeant G. F. Booth. Slattery became the longest-serving British POW of World War II.

Fifteen Blenheim medium bombers of 107 and 110 Squadrons flew a mission to attack German ships. Several planes had to return to base having failed to find their target. Of the five remaining planes of 107 Squadron, four were shot down over Wilhelmshaven. Murphy was killed alongside two fellow crewmen, Sergeant L R Ward and AC2 E Patemam. Murphy was 23 years old.

He was buried in Sage War Cemetery, Germany.

References

Royal Air Force officers
1916 births
1939 deaths
Royal Air Force pilots of World War II
British World War II bomber pilots
Royal Air Force personnel killed in World War II
People from County Cork